Grande Prairie is a city in northwest Alberta, Canada within the southern portion of an area known as Peace River Country. The city is surrounded by the County of Grande Prairie No. 1.

Grande Prairie was the seventh-largest city in Alberta in 2016, with a population of 63,166, and was one of Canada's fastest growing cities between 2001 and 2006, and Canada's northernmost city with more than 50,000 people.

The city adopted the trumpeter swan as an official symbol due to its proximity to the migration route and summer nesting grounds of this bird. For that reason, Grande Prairie is sometimes nicknamed the "Swan City". The dinosaur has also emerged as an unofficial symbol of the city due to paleontology discoveries in the areas north and west of Grande Prairie.

History 

The Grande Prairie area was historically known as Buffalo Plains, after the buffalo who would traverse the large prairie which lies to the north, east, and west of it. Émile Grouard, a Roman Catholic Priest, was the first to refer to the area as La Grande Prairie. In the 18th century, the prairie was occupied by bands of the Dane-zaa (Beaver) peoples, who began, in the early 19th century, trading with the North West Company at Dunvegan. The earliest recorded reference to the prairie was by Hudson Bay trader Samuel Black in 1824.

In 1880, as a result of the fur trade war between the Hudson Bay Company (which merged with the North West Company in 1821), and independent fur traders, centering around Dunvegan, a Hudson's Bay Company outpost called La Grande Prairie was established by George Kennedy.

In the late 19th century, the prairie was settled by Cree and Iroquois from around Jasper and Lac Ste. Anne. When 17 townships were surveyed for homesteading in 1909, a land rush soon followed, with many settlers arriving over the Edson Trail. In 1910, the Grande Prairie Townsite was sub-divided. By 1912, it included a bank, hotel, post office, and land office, making it a district metropolis. In 1916, it became the terminus of the Edmonton, Dunvegan and British Columbia Railway from Edmonton.

The Edson Trail from Edson to Grande Prairie was opened in 1911 as a means for settlers to reach the Grande Prairie area. It was basically nothing more than a tract of clear cut bush and forest, and thus was a very difficult route for many settlers, especially during wet weather. Because of this, large scale settlement came late compared to other major farming regions further south in Canada. Grande Prairie was incorporated as a village by the Province of Alberta in 1914, but it was not until the arrival of the railway in 1916 that farmland quickly expanded as waves of settlers came into the Peace region.

The arrival of the railway and the increased settlement in the area drove up Grande Prairie's population past the 1,000 mark, allowing it to incorporate as a town on March 27, 1919. A local recession in the 1920s caused a temporary depopulation of Grande Prairie. But the population rebounded afterwards by the 1930s, by which time the population had reached 1,464. Settlement continued unabated even into the 1930s during the Dust Bowl era because the Peace Region was able to escape the severe drought conditions that plagued the Canadian Prairies further south at the time.

The Second World War saw the US and Canadian military establish Grande Prairie as a part of the Northwest Staging Route and for the construction of the Alaska Highway from Dawson Creek to Alaska. Although Dawson Creek was chosen as the major starting point of the construction of the Alaska Highway, Grande Prairie was a major stopover point for military aircraft during the war, and benefited economically from this.

Although Grande Prairie was well located in the southern edge of the Peace Country, it was competing with the towns of Peace River and Dawson Creek for the title of the most important centre of commerce and agriculture in the region until the late 1950s, when its population growth began to outstrip these towns as oil and natural gas exploration was underway in the Peace Region, especially since the first major discovery of oil further south in Leduc near Edmonton in 1947 and the construction of a large pulp mill south of the city in the early 1970s.

The construction and paving of Highway 43 (originally sections of Highways 2, 34, and 43 from the BC border to the Yellowhead Highway just west of Edmonton) in 1956 cut down on the travel time by road significantly, further enhancing Grande Prairie's accessibility and economic status.

The town of Grande Prairie was incorporated as a city in 1958. At that time, its population was approximately 7,600.

The opening of the Procter & Gamble kraft pulp mill in 1972 and the discovery of the Elmworth deep basin gas field spurred an economic boom. Grande Prairie's population went from just over 12,000 in the early 1970s to over 24,000 by the time the oil boom went bust in 1981.

In the five years from 2001 to 2006, Grande Prairie was one of the fastest-growing cities in Canada, growing from 37,000 to 47,000 people. After 2006, and with another recession, the population decreased slightly, followed by a slow increase to just over 69,000 by 2018.

Geography 

The city is surrounded by farmland to the north, east, and west. To the south lies a vast boreal forest with aspen, tamarack, lodgepole pine, jack pine, and black spruce extending well into the foothills of the Canadian Rockies south and southwest of the city.

Bear Creek goes through the city from the northwest to the south end and is a tributary of the Wapiti River to the south. The Bear Creek Reservoir is the small body of water by Grande Prairie Regional College in the northwest part of the city, and is ringed by marshy wetland. The terrain immediately surrounding Grande Prairie is largely flat to gently rolling, but rises gradually to hilly terrain closer to the foothills to the south and southwest. On clear days, some peaks in the Rockies are visible to the southwest from Grande Prairie.

The city lies on the southern edge of aspen parkland, which is a transitional biome between boreal forest and prairie. The Peace River Country contains the northernmost area of aspen parkland in North America. However, much of the aspen parkland in the region has long since been destroyed by extensive farming and oil/gas drilling activity.

Climate 
Grande Prairie has a northern continental climate typical of northwestern Alberta and northeastern British Columbia, classified as humid continental (Dfb), bordering closely on a subarctic climate (Dfc) with old data under the Köppen climate classification. Winters are generally very cold with some mild spells. Summers are often fairly cool to pleasantly warm in the daytime, but nights can be cool despite the long summer days typical for its latitude. Winter conditions can vary tremendously from year to year. Winters have been known to be mild enough to produce "brown Christmas" conditions, where little or no snow may fall until after Christmas due to unusually mild early winter conditions.

Snowfall amounts, however, vary greatly from year to year. Being fairly close to the foothills of the Canadian Rockies, it can get quite windy in Grande Prairie, especially in the spring and fall. Chinooks may occur in and bring winter thaws to the Grande Prairie area.
Grande Prairie has 314 days with measureable sunshine per year on average, and just above 2,200 hours of bright sunshine or about 46.1% of possible sunshine, ranging from a low of 31.2% in November to a high of 59.1% in July.

Summers can bring thunderstorms, although they are not as frequent nor as severe as those further south in Central Alberta. Rainfall can vary from year to year, but the Peace Region is noted for never having experienced truly severe drought conditions more typical of Southern Alberta and neighbouring Saskatchewan. Tornadoes are rare but not unheard of in the Peace Region. A tornado struck the downtown area and east side of Grande Prairie on July 8, 2004. Although the tornado was considered a very weak one (F0-F1 on the Fujita scale) and the weather was not severe at the time, it was still strong enough to damage houses and flip vehicles. There were no casualties or deaths.

Demographics 

In the 2021 census, 15.9% of residents were visible minorities, while 11.7% were Indigenous and the remaining 72.4% were white/European. The largest visible minority groups were Filipino (6.9%), South Asian (2.9%), Black (2.2%), Latin American (0.8%), Chinese (0.8%) and Arab (0.6%).

As of 2021, 83.8% of residents claimed English as their first language. Other common mother tongues were Tagalog (3.4%), French (2.1%), Punjabi (0.8%), Spanish (0.8%), and German (0.6%) . 2.0% listed both English and a non-official language as mother tongues, while 0.6% listed both English and French.

45.8% of residents were Christian in 2021, down from 58.5% in 2011. 20.4% were Catholic,  11.3% were Christian n.o.s, 10.0% were Protestant, and 4.1% belonged to other Christian denominations or Christian-related traditions. 49.4% were non-religious or secular, up from 39.2% in 2011. All other religions and spiritual traditions accounted for 4.8% of the population, up from 2.3% in 2011. The largest non-Christian religions were Islam (1.7%), Hinduism (1.1%) and Sikhism (0.8%).

Crime rate
Until recently (including 2015), Grande Prairie topped the list for the national average for the Crime Severity Index, but in the 2016 report published by Maclean's, the city was in 12th place. The Crime Severity Index was 150 per 100,000 people, compared to the national average of 70.96. Grande Prairie was 13th on the Violent Crime Severity Index with 139 per 100,000 people versus a 75.25 average for all municipalities included in the report.

Economy 

Grande Prairie possesses a diversified economy. Major industries include oil and gas, agriculture, forestry, and food services.

Agriculture was the first economic mainstay of Grande Prairie since settlement began in the early 20th century. It remains part of the local economy today. A variety of crops such as barley, wheat, canola, and oats are grown in the area. Livestock such as cattle and buffalo (bison) are also raised in the area. Despite being north of the 55th parallel, the climate is mild enough to allow for farming on a large scale to prosper. Longer daylight hours during the summer at this latitude aid in crop production. The Peace Country is the northernmost major farming region in North America. Land within the region is still being cleared for new farmland.

Although some oil and gas drilling has been ongoing in the area since the 1950s, oil and gas exploration did not begin to occur on a large scale until the late 1970s. It was in the mid to late-1970s that the Elmworth gas field was discovered and developed, causing the city to grow rapidly until the oil boom ended in 1981. Today Grande Prairie's location atop both the Montney and Duvernay geological formations have seen local extraction activities focused on natural-gas condensate and shale gas. As a result of this focus the region has maintained relatively high levels of activity when compared to areas where conventional resources, shallow gas or heavy oil are the primary resources.

Forestry is a major part of Grande Prairie's economy, for large tracts of forest lie to the south in the foothills of the Canadian Rockies. International Paper (formerly Weyerhaeuser Canada) kraft pulp mill, opened in 1972 by Procter & Gamble, is one of Grande Prairie's largest employers. Canfor runs a sawmill and lumber yard operation on the west side of the city. Norbord (formerly Ainsworth) oriented strand board plant opened in late 1995.

Grande Prairie serves as the economic and transportation hub for a trading area of nearly 290,000 people. Grande Prairie is also on the CANAMEX trade route linking Canada, the United States, and Mexico.

Government and politics 
Since its start in 1930, the Grande Prairie provincial district (and later the Grande Prairie-Wapiti district) has elected a candidate of the government party in every election, except for two exceptions. Alberta politics being what it is, Grande Prairie was able to do this by electing a UFA in 1930, a Social Credit candidate in 1935 then consistently electing a rightist candidate in every election from 1940 to the present.

Arts and culture

Live music can be found in several downtown bars and intermittently at all-ages locations such as Tito's Restaurant and the GP Curling Club. Summer-long music festivals have been organized by community-minded individuals and charitable organizations. Grande Prairie has a wide range of local music genres, including country (such as Tenille Townes, Brad Sims, and more); reggae (Tasman Jude); metal (Arrival of Autumn); folk; rock, and more

Cultural venues include Revolution Place (a concert hall and hockey rink—the local AJHL team, the Grande Prairie Storm, plays there), the Grande Prairie Museum, the Art Gallery of Grande Prairie, 214 place, the tallest commercial building in the city, and Second Street Theatre. Grande Prairie is also home to a professional musical theatre company, "Broadway Live Broadway".

The Reel Shorts Film Festival is a five-day international festival of short films that takes place at Grande Prairie Live Theatre's Second Street Theatre in early May.

The Philip J. Currie Dinosaur Museum, located fifteen minutes west of Grande Prairie, is a  building with many exhibits, a large theatre, classrooms, a paleontology lab, a gift shop, and a restaurant. The museum is named after Philip J. Currie, from the University of Alberta, who has contributed to the understanding of the link between dinosaurs and birds.

Sports and recreation 
In 1995, the city hosted the Canada Games. The event was televised nationally on CBC Television. Hundreds of athletes competed in the events and the city gained status and recognition as a result. The city played host to the 2010 Arctic Winter Games from March 6–13, 2010.

There are a number of parks in Grande Prairie, including the large Muskoseepi Park in the Bear Creek valley which winds its way throughout the city. Muskoseepi Park has excellent walking and bike trails extending nearly the entire length of Bear Creek, from the northwest to the southeast of the city. The park also contains the Ernie Radbourne Pavilion, the outdoor Bear Creek Swimming Pool and the outdoor Muskoseepi Park Pond which converts into a skating rink in the winter.

Crystal Lake in the northeast part of the city also has parkland, preserved wetlands (great for birdwatching), and walking/bike paths around its entire circumference.

Nestled within spruce and pine trees, on the south east side of the city, just a couple of minutes from downtown, is Evergreen Park. The park and facilities are home to the annual Grande Prairie Stompede event, which draws upwards of 30,000 people annually. The park is the largest full featured exhibition facility north of Edmonton, and can cater to upwards of 10,000 people at a time. It has a restaurant (open daily) and a lounge, and hosts events such as agricultural shows, rodeos, chuckwagon races, horse racing, sportsman and RV shows. A variety of halls, convention spaces and conference facilities all with paved parking are available. The largest building, the Entrec Centre has  of space, with a  main hall, and has hosted many concerts and trade shows in the past. Evergreen Park also has a 76 spot RV and Marine Campground which is open in the summer from May to October, as well as an archery centre, an equestrian facility, and 12 baseball diamonds.

Grande Prairie has three 18-hole golf courses, The Dunes Golf and Winter Club, the Bear Creek Golf Club, and the Grande Prairie Golf and Country Club.

Early in 2017, a new nine hole course, The Bear Paw Golf Course, with a par level of 3 opened up in the South Bear Creek Recreation Area.

Grande Prairie has three 18-hole disc golf courses.  Thrill Hill in the Swanavon neighbourhood, South Bear Creek, and Coop Community Course at Evergreen Park.

Downhill skiing is popular in Grande Prairie, which has a local ski hill called Nitehawk and is located south of the city on the south bank of the Wapiti River. Aside from skiing, Nitehawk also has the only North American natural luge track certified for international events, and over the summer months freestyle ski jumpers practice using the Northern Extreme water ramp facility. It is also active in luge as a naturally refrigerated venue, hosting the FIL World Luge Natural Track Championships in 2007.

Cross-country skiing is also common during the winter. The Wapiti Nordic Ski Club is one of Canada's premier cross country skiing and biathlon facilities, and is just south of the city. There are also snowshoe trails as well as dog friendly trails. In the summer, the trails are used for hiking, mountain biking, and running.

The foothills south of Grande Prairie and around Grande Cache are visited year-round for hiking in the summer and for snowmobiling and other winter sports in the winter.

On the South side of the city, off of Resources Road, is the Wapiti Shooters Club. The club was founded in 1949, and due to the many upgrades over the years is considered one of the finest shooting clubs in Alberta. It offers Shotgun (Trap, Sporting Clays, and Skeet), Handgun (outdoor 12 lanes, indoor 6 lanes), and a  outdoor covered rifle range. The club is also used for business functions, birthday parties, RCMP, Sheriff, and Safety training. Over the years many top level coaches and athletes from all over Canada have trained or entered into events at the club. In addition, the club is currently developing a long rifle range suitable for high power rifles, north of the city, near Webster.  There is also an indoor shooting range (Bullets and Broadheads) across the street from (west of) the Prairie Mall.

Grande Prairie also has a new and modern  health and fitness facility known as the Eastlink Centre. It is a large indoor fitness facility that has two indoor pools: a 50-meter, deep water Olympic sized pool, and a 25-meter, wheelchair accessible, higher temperature, shallow water Program Pool.  Other aquatic amenities include a splash park, a lazy river, waterslides, and a surf simulator. The facility also includes a large weight room, squash and racquetball courts, fitness classes, a daycare service, a multi-use basketball court, a summer outdoor 5,000 sq. ft. concrete skateboard park,  and additional other amenities and programs. The Eastlink Centre is located in the city's southwest and connects St. Joseph High School, the Grande Prairie Gymnastics Centre, the Coca-Cola Centre, and Charles Spencer High School. In March 2012 the Eastlink Centre received an award for its exceptional accessibility features.

The Outdoor Bear Creek Swimming Pool, in Muskoseepi Park, was reopened in the summer of 2019, after extensive modifications.  The new renovations include a Tots Pool, a Zero Beach, Spanish Steps, Lily Islands, a Games Area, and a Waterslide.

The Leisure Centre (previously known as the Rec-Plex) is located in northwest Grande Prairie near the Bear Creek Reservoir. In December 2011, after the Eastlink Centre opened, the majority of the Leisure Centre was closed, with unrealized plans to reopen in the second half of 2013. Currently the swimming pool and gym remain closed, but the indoor soccer pitch is open for a variety of sports.

Over the years Grande Prairie has played host to many tournaments including:
2004 Royal Bank Cup
2006 Ford World Women's Curling Championship
2009 Players' Championship
2010 Arctic Winter Games
2011 Players' Championship
2012 Pomeroy Inn & Suites Prairie Showdown (Pomeroy Inn & Suites Prairie Showdown)
2013 Pomeroy Inn & Suites Prairie Showdown
2015 Canada Cup of Curling
2016 Scotties Tournament of Hearts

The city also has the following ice hockey teams:

Transportation

Air 
The Grande Prairie Airport is located at the west end of the city and serves the region with daily scheduled flights to Calgary and Edmonton. Two airlines, Air Canada Express and WestJet Encore, offer service to the airport. The airport has seen growth in both passenger and aircraft traffic in recent years, and now serves just under a half a million passengers annually. The Grande Prairie Airport was originally developed in the 1930s as a grass only strip at its present site. In 1941 in support of the war effort, and the building of the Alaska Highway, the facility was expanded for utilization by the Royal Canadian Air Force and the United States Air Force. In 1950 the airport came under the authority of the Federal Government until February 1, 1997, at which time it was transferred to the City of Grande Prairie.

The terminal, built in 1981, was renovated in 2009 making it twice its original size. A forthcoming expansion includes an upgrade to the parking system. Currently the airport has no customs capabilities (although a temporary customs facility was set up for the 2010 Arctic Winter Games).

Swanberg Air formerly operated out of the airport until they ceased operations in 2011. They flew cargo, scheduled, and charter passenger services in Alberta, Saskatchewan, and British Columbia.

City public transit 
Grande Prairie Transit is a small public transit system with modern buses and a route system integrated throughout the city.

Intercity bus 
Greyhound Canada offered scheduled bus service from its Grande Prairie terminal to Edmonton and Dawson Creek. This service was terminated in October 2018. Red Arrow once connected Grande Prairie to Edmonton, but that service was also cancelled. Bus service to Edmonton is now provided by Cold Shot Bus Service.

Highways and roads 

Highway 43 is the main east–west highway through the city providing a connection from Edmonton to the southeast through to British Columbia to the west. Highway 43 meets Highway 2 a few kilometres north of the city at the Four Mile Interchange, then continues south into the city, via the city bypass, and exits the city at the west end near the airport. The short stretch of Highway 2 extending just north and just west of Grande Prairie was renumbered to Highway 43 in the late 1990s to link with the rest of Highway 43 i.e.: the Yellowhead Highway from Edmonton. This explains why newer maps no longer show both short stretches as Highway 2. The renumbering was also due to Highway 43 now being a part of the CANAMEX trade route and being widened to a four-lane divided highway.

The four lane Highway 43X bypass, skirts the northwest corner of the city from the Four Mile Interchange to Highway 43 just west of the airport.   The Highway 43X bypass was completed in stages, over several years, and was fully opened to traffic in September 2019. The Highway 43X Bypass permits traffic to go around the city's north west region, and reduces traffic on the city bypass, which was built in the 1960s, had become fully engulfed within the city, and was somewhat congested with traffic.

Highway 40 is the primary access road into Grande Prairie from the south, and extends southward to Grande Cache, and Jasper National Park.  It is part of the shortest fully paved route to Alaska from the lower 48 states, so Grande Prairie sees many vacationers heading to Alaska by road during the summer via Highway 40 northward into Grande Prairie, then Highway 43 westward towards Dawson Creek, BC, which is "Mile 0" of the Alaska Highway.

Rail 
The City of Grande Prairie has rail freight service provided by CN. Trackage runs south from Grande Prairie to Grande Cache and Hinton, where it joins CN's main transcontinental line. CN also operates local freight service out of Grande Prairie on former Northern Alberta Railways tracks - north to Sexsmith and Rycroft, and west to Beaverlodge and Hythe.

Savage Alberta Railway, which operated from 1999 to 2006, was owned by North American RailNet and had its headquarters in the city prior to being purchased by CN.

Education

Elementary and secondary schools 
Four school districts operate schools within Grande Prairie.

The Grande Prairie Public School District (GPPSD) operates 18 schools.

Grande Prairie Roman Catholic Separate School District No. 28 operates ten schools within Grande Prairie.

The Peace Wapiti School Division No. 76 (PWSD) operates three schools in Grande Prairie that serve students of the surrounding County of Grande Prairie No. 1.

The Northwest Francophone Education Region No. 1  operates École Nouvelle Frontière for students in kindergarten to grade 12.

Aside from the two outreach schools that provide alternative curriculum for high school students, Grande Prairie's high schools are the Grande Prairie Composite High School (GPPSD), St. Joseph's Catholic High School (GP&DCS), Ecole Nouvelle Frontiere, Charles Spencer High School (GPPSD) and Peace Wapiti Academy (PWSD).

Post-secondary 
Northwestern Polytechnic (NWP), previously known as Grande Prairie Regional College, was originally incorporated as the Grande Prairie Junior College in 1965 and opened its doors in 1966. After being renamed Grande Prairie Regional College (GPRC) in 1970, construction of the present campus began in 1973 based on a plan prepared by Canadian architect Douglas Cardinal. The first phase opened in 1974 followed by the second phase in 1991. GPRC was renamed Northwestern Polytechnic in March 2022.  The President of NWP is Justin Kohlman.

Media

Notable people 

Theodore deWit "Willie deWit", former professional and Olympic boxer
Tanner Fritz, professional ice hockey player for the New York Islanders of the NHL
Leslie Greentree, poet
Carolyn Dawn Johnson, country music singer-songwriter
Kelly Sutherland (chuckwagon) retired professional chuckwagon driver
Viktor (Eric Thompson),  professional wrestler
Tenille Townes, country music singer
Chris Warkentin, Canadian politician, Conservative Member of Parliament (2006-)
William Paul Young, novelist
Alex Zahara, actor

References

External links 

 Article at thecanadianencyclopedia.ca

 
1914 establishments in Alberta
Cities in Alberta
Hudson's Bay Company trading posts